The 2015 season was Viking's third full season with Kjell Jonevret as manager. They are competing in the Tippeligaen and the cup.

Squad

Out on loan

Transfers

Winter

In:

 

Out:

Summer

In:

Out:

Competitions

Tippeligaen

Table

Results summary

Results by round

Matches

Norwegian Cup

Squad statistics

Appearances and goals

|-
|colspan="14"|Players away from Viking on loan:
|-
|colspan="14"|Players who left Viking during the season:

|}

Goal scorers

Disciplinary record

References

Viking FK seasons
Viking